Oxyporus latemarginatus is a plant pathogen affecting trees.

See also 
 List of apricot diseases
 List of avocado diseases
 List of citrus diseases
 List of peach and nectarine diseases
 List of Platanus diseases
 List of sweetgum diseases

References 

Fungi described in 1856
Fungal tree pathogens and diseases
Fruit tree diseases
Avocado tree diseases
Fungal citrus diseases
Stone fruit tree diseases
Hymenochaetales